The following is a list of higher education institutions in Hong Kong, under Hong Kong law.

Only the first three categories (UGC-funded institutions, self-funded institutions and public institutions, except Hong Kong Institute of Vocational Education) are eligible to award bachelor's degree or above in Hong Kong.

Notation
The following notation is used:
UGC-funded universities: universities funded by public and under the University Grants Committee
Self-funded institutions: higher education institutions that are self-funded
Public institutions: higher education institutions funded by the Hong Kong Government (public funds)
Sub-degree institutions: higher education institutions for their academic awards up to sub-degree level

UGC-funded universities

Alphabetised List

Self-funded institutions

Alphabetised List
Note 1: The Open University of Hong Kong was established and financed by the Hong Kong Government from 1989 to 1993. Since then, it has been self-financed but still receives some irregular subsidies and loans from the government.

Note 2: In January 2007, the Hong Kong government offered a one-off grant of HK$200 million to establish a general development fund to support the academic development and improve the campus facilities of Hong Kong Shue Yan University.

Note 3: In August 2017, the Hong Kong government announced 6 self-funded institutions, Caritas Institute of Higher Education, Chu Hai College of Higher Education, Hang Seng Management College, The Open University of Hong Kong, Tung Wah College and Technological and Higher Education Institute of Hong Kong will be included in the Study Subsidy Scheme for Designated Professions/Sectors (SSSDP) from 2018.

Note 4: In July 2017, the Hong Kong government announced that the Non-means-tested Subsidy Scheme for Self-financing Undergraduate Studies in Hong Kong will include full-time self-financing degree programmes from 15 (non-UGC funded) institutions for the cohort to be admitted in the 2017/18 academic year.

Public institutions

Sub-degree institutions

Other institutions
 Savannah College of Art and Design of Hong Kong is a campus of a US-based university in North Kowloon Magistracy. The school was shut down in 2020.
 University of Chicago Francis and Rose Yuen Campus in Hong Kong

See also
Hong Kong

List of Hong Kong university vice-chancellors and presidents
Education in Hong Kong
Higher education in Hong Kong
Hong Kong Council for Accreditation of Academic and Vocational Qualifications
List of schools in Hong Kong
List of buildings and structures in Hong Kong

Other lists of universities
List of colleges and universities by country
List of colleges and universities

Notes

External links
Degree-awarding higher education institution List at the Education Bureau
Information Portal for Accredited Self-financing Post-secondary Programmes
Ranking Web and Directory of Universities of Hong Kong

Universities
Hong Kong
Hong Kong

Hong Kong

de:Liste weiterführender Bildungseinrichtungen in Hongkong